Two ships of the United States Navy have been named Bushnell after David Bushnell.

 , a submarine tender, was launched 9 February 1915.
 , a submarine tender, was launched 14 September 1942.

References
 

United States Navy ship names